Macraucheniopsis is an extinct genus of litoptern mammal belonging to the family Macraucheniidae from the Middle to Late Pleistocene of Argentina. It, along with Macrauchenia, Neolicaphrium, and Xenorhinotherium were among the youngest known genera of litopterns.

Classification  
Cladogram based in the phylogenetic analysis published by Schmidt et al., 2014, showing the position of Macraucheniopsis:

References

Macraucheniids
Pleistocene mammals of South America
Pleistocene Argentina
Ensenadan
Lujanian
Fossils of Argentina
Fossil taxa described in 1945
Prehistoric placental genera
Quaternary Argentina